Sunny Dooley is a Diné storyteller born into the Saltwater Clan and born from the Water's Edge Clan. She shares Hane', or Diné Blessingway stories, and is a former Miss Navajo Nation, having won the title in 1982.

Biography
Dooley was born to parents Dorothy and Tom Dooley. She is from the Chi Chil' Tah (Where the Oaks Grow) community in New Mexico, and grew up on the Navajo reservation in Arizona. She learned to speak Diné Bizaad as her first language and learned the skill of storytelling from her mother. As a storyteller, Dooley shares stories that have been passed down through generations in her family. 

In 1979, Dooley graduated from West High School in Salt Lake City, Utah. She attended the University of New Mexico, where she received an Associate of Art degree. She later graduated from Brigham Young University, majoring in speech communications and minoring in art. While at the school, she was awarded Miss Indian Brigham Young University.

In 1982, she competed in Miss Navajo Nation. During the competition's skills portion, she told a story about the Changing Woman. She won the competition, becoming Miss Navajo Nation from 1982 to 1983. After the contest, she continued storytelling. She performed at the National Museum of the American Indian in Washington, D.C. around 2009. A year later, she published a story called "Mai and the Cliff-Dwelling Birds" in the 2010 book, Trickster: Native American Tales.

As of 2021, Dooley lives in Chi Chil' Tah in a hogan, a traditional log house.

References

Living people
Year of birth missing (living people)
Storytellers
Women storytellers
Navajo people
People from New Mexico
University of New Mexico alumni
Brigham Young University alumni